The 28th annual National Geographic Bee was held between May 22–25, 2016 in Washington, DC. For the first time, the bee was moderated by the American humorist, journalist and actor Mo Rocca and featured a grand prize of a $50,000 college scholarship. The champion was Rishi Nair of Williams Magnet Middle School in Tampa, Florida, who won the $50,000 scholarship, lifetime membership to the National Geographic Society, and a Lindblad expedition to southeast Alaska. The 2nd-place winner was Saketh Jonnalagadda of Stony Brook Middle School in Westford, Massachusetts, who won a $25,000 scholarship. The 3rd-place winner was Kapil Nathan of Brock's Gap Intermediate School in Hoover, Alabama, who won a $10,000 scholarship. Rishi was also the First sixth-grade National Champion since 2008.

2016 State Champions

Preliminary rounds

Ten preliminary rounds held on May 23, 2016. Each State Champion had to answer ten oral questions, and prior to their arrival in Washington, D.C., had to submit a video related to a topic. The video was worth up to six points, hence the highest possible number of points was 16. One 16 and 4 15s were scored. A 9-way tie for 14 pts was broken with 4 exiting the competition. The ten finalists were announced around 11:30. The top ten finalists were as follows:
Kapil Nathan- from Alabama; 14/16 (9/10 + 5/6)
 Rishi Nair- from Florida; 15/16 (10/10 + 5/6)
Rishi Kumar- from Maryland; 14/16 (8/10 + 6/6)
Saketh Jonnalagadda- from Massachusetts; 14/16 (9/10 + 5/6)
 Lucas Eggers- from Minnesota; 16/16 (10/10 + 6/6) (only one with a perfect score in the preliminary rounds)
 Grace Rembert- from Montana; 15/16 (10/10 + 5/6)
Samanyu Dixit- from North Carolina; 15/16 (10/10 + 5/6)
Ashwin Sivakumar- from Oregon; 15/16 (9/10 + 6/6)
Pranay Varada- from Texas; 14/16 (9/10 + 5/6)
Thomas Wright- from Wisconsin; 14/16 (9/10 + 5/6)

Final rounds

The finals consisted of questions regarding the U.S. through Rounds 1–5, with 4 eliminated once Round 5 was over. A tie existed between Rishi Kumar and Lucas Eggers, with the latter exiting the competition. After that, questions regarding the world appeared. A three-way tie existed between Grace Rembert, Rishi Kumar again, and Kapil Nathan with the latter entering the final three. After Nathan was eliminated, the final two moved on to the Championships – Jonnalagadda and Nair. The latter won the competition.

References

2016 in Washington, D.C.
2016 in education
National Geographic Bee